Bien Bien (1989–2002) was an American Thoroughbred racehorse bred by William S. Farish III & William S. Kilroy and raced by Trudy McCaffery and John Toffan.

He won eight stakes races during his career, including four Grade I events. He set a course record of 1:57.75 for 1¼ miles while winning the 1993 Hollywood Invitational Turf Handicap. He also ran second in the 1993 Breeders' Cup Turf to winner Kotashaan.

Bien Bien was retired to stud for the 1995 season. He stood at Mill Ridge Farm near Lexington, Kentucky, until 2000, when he was sent to Kirtlington Stud near Kirtlington, Oxfordshire, England. During his relatively short career at stud, he sired:
 Bienamado (b. 1996) – in France won the Prix de Condé (1998) and in California, the 2000 Hollywood Turf Cup Stakes (2000) and San Juan Capistrano Invitational Handicap (2001) and Charles Whittingham Memorial Handicap. Career earnings of $1,261,089;
 Bien Nicole (b. 1998) – won 2003 Oaklawn Breeders Cup Stakes, Galaxy Stakes. Career earnings of $1,074,620.
 Dream Alliance (2001) – a steeplechaser who won the Welsh Grand National

Bien Bien died of a heart attack at age thirteen on March 11, 2002, after covering a mare at Kirtlington Stud.

Pedigree

References
 Bien Bien's pedigree and partial racing stats
 Information and photo of the bronze bust of Bien Bien by Nina Kaiser
 March 13, 2002 Bloodhorse.com article titled English Stallion Bien Bien Dies

1989 racehorse births
2002 racehorse deaths
Racehorses bred in Kentucky
Racehorses trained in the United States
Horse racing track record setters
Thoroughbred family 9-e